Detective Chimp is a superhero appearing in American comic books published by DC Comics. A common chimpanzee who wears a deerstalker hat (à la Sir Arthur Conan Doyle's fictional sleuth Sherlock Holmes), Detective Chimp has superhuman-level intelligence and solves crimes, often with the help of the Bureau of Amplified Animals, a group of intelligent animals that also includes Rex the Wonder Dog. He was originally created in the final years of the Golden Age of Comic Books, during the interregnum between the former and the Silver Age of Comic Books.

After his initial appearance in Adventures of Rex the Wonder Dog he continued to appear in that title as a backup feature until 1959, at which point he faded into obscurity. Several decades after his last appearance, Detective Chimp appeared in several cameos, namely in a 1981 story, "Whatever Happened to Rex the Wonder Dog?" (DC Comics Presents #35) and later in a brief cameo with Sam Simeon in Gorilla City during 1985's Crisis on Infinite Earths. Following these appearances, Bobo started appearing in DC titles with some regularity, appearing in issues of Green Lantern, The Flash, and other titles. This eventually led to prominent roles in the 2005 Day of Vengeance miniseries and subsequently as a regular in its spin-off series Shadowpact. The character has gone on to guest-star in other DC Comics titles, and has been a key member of the second incarnation of the Justice League Dark since its 2018 reboot.

Fictional character biography
When first introduced, Detective Chimp was a simple, although intelligent, trained chimpanzee, who acted as a "helping mascot" for the local sheriff, after helping him to solve the murder of his chimpanzee trainer, Fred Thorpe. He could not speak, but could understand humans and make himself understood. Bobo, a smoker, is a member of Mensa, and had a long-standing partnership with four other detectives as the Croatoan Society. One of the other former members of the Society was the detective/superhero Ralph Dibny.

The Chimp's origin has been revamped and elaborated on several times since his initial Silver Age appearances. 1989's Secret Origins (vol. 2) #40 credited the experimentation of a microscopic alien race with Bobo's intelligence. This origin has since been retconned, notably in the Day of Vengeance six-part limited series. In the latter it was shown that Bobo was captured in Gorilla City, Equatorial Africa in 1953 by Fred Thorpe, who sought to train him for his carnival act: "Bobo the Detective Chimp". For the act, Detective Chimp was trained to answer some detective-related questions using a combination of signals and rewards, giving the illusion that he could "discover the deepest secrets of the public". Bobo formed a strong bond with Thorpe because Thorpe took care of him, and gave him a simpler life than in the jungle. The success of the act lasted until a trip to Florida, at which time Rex the Wonder Dog, took him to the Fountain of Youth, where he gained the ability to speak to all living creatures, even humans, in their own language, as well as eternal youth. Rex's and Bobo's journey to the Fountain of Youth was originally depicted in the aforementioned DC Comics Presents #35, July 1981. The intelligence Bobo gained put a damper on the success of the sideshow act, and in at least one instance, he decided that a woman had in fact murdered her sister, and shared his insights with the local police.

At some point after this, Bobo was employed by the Bureau of Amplified Animals. It is not known how he left, or even if the Bureau still exists.

After the death of Fred Thorpe, he began to work by himself. Initially he did quite well, as a chimp detective was seen as a novelty. During this successful period he was visited by another detective, John Jones (actually the Martian Manhunter, during the JLApe crisis), who thought Bobo's agency seemed to be doing better than his own.

However, as an ape, without civil rights and being unable to stand as a juridical person, he could not enforce unpaid bills. When the public began to forget him, he became an alcoholic, never leaving the other-dimensional Oblivion Bar (which changed management twice during his time there), until the establishment was acquired by Jim Rook.

"Bobo" is not his real name, which he declines to share. It is revealed by the Phantom Stranger to be "mostly an unpronounceable screech and three grunts", which translates as "Magnificent Finder of Tasty Grubs".

Shadowpact

When the Spectre attempts to destroy all magic and began killing wizards, Detective Chimp, while still mostly drunk, coerces a group of mystical characters gathered from the Oblivion Bar into battling the Spectre. This leads to the formation of the group the Shadowpact.

Although lacking superhuman powers, Detective Chimp exhibits not only fine detective skills but also the genius of a true tactician. Benefiting from the counsel of the Phantom Stranger (at the time transformed into a mouse), he devises a plan to use the powers of Black Alice and Nightshade to confront the combined menace of Eclipso and the Spectre.

Bobo also helps clean up the demonic damage left from the Rock of Eternity's explosion over Gotham City. He captures the sin of "Sloth", which had possessed his long-time friend Rex the Wonder Dog. After the Rock is reformed, the sins re-imprisoned, and all magical influence cleaned out of Gotham, the dying Doctor Fate gives Detective Chimp the powerful Helmet of Fate. After finding it does not fit him, Detective Chimp convinces Captain Marvel to throw it to Earth, to let fate choose its next bearer.

When the helmet of Doctor Fate returns to Earth, Detective Chimp for a brief time bonds with it, granting him additional powers that he uses to assist the Gotham City police in apprehending the villain Trickster. After struggling against the temptation of the helmet, Bobo sends it on to another journey.

Recently, it has been shown that Bobo occasionally assists Batman in his cases by way of a chat room where they swap theories. The Riddler is also known to chat with them, but he is unaware of the other two's identities.

The New 52
In DC's 2011 reboot of its continuity, Detective Chimp has been mentioned by Ambush Bug in the Channel 52 feature sections. He later appears as a brief cameo in aiding the Justice League United team rescue Adam Strange from the Zeta Beam and in the 2016 DC Comics Rebirth Christmas Special story "The Night We Saved Christmas".

DC Rebirth
In DC Rebirth, Detective Chimp, a.k.a. Bobo, has appeared in the Dark Nights: Metal event, is one of the survivors of the invasion of the Dark Nights (alternate versions of Batman from a Dark Multiverse) and is seen at the Oblivion Bar alongside the Justice League, Kendra Saunders, Doctor Fate and others. Bobo's close friend Nightmaster, the owner of the Oblivion Bar, is killed in this confrontation. Bobo later takes over the bar and Nightmaster's mystical duties. Bobo becomes a central part of a new mystical team called 'Justice League Dark'. This is led by Wonder Woman. It includes but is not limited to, John Constantine, Zatanna, Doctor Fate, Man-Bat and Swamp Thing. Bobo loses his friend the Blue Devil to mystical purists.

In the pages of "The New Golden Age", Detective Chimp accompanied Doctor Fate in looking for Deadman to see if he can help them understand Hauhet who is the new guiding force of the Helmet of Fate. When a Huntress from a possible future arrived in the present after her visit to 1940, she finds herself in the company of Doctor Fate, Detective Chimp, and Deadman. Detective Chimp states to Huntress that they can do some introductions over a round of drinks where Deadman will pay for the first round.

Powers and abilities
Detective Chimp possesses no unusual physical abilities, save the level of agility and physical strength that comes with being a chimpanzee with human knowledge of movement and tools. He is capable of conversing with all animals, regardless of origin, in their own language, including all spoken and written human languages. He is also one of the most highly skilled investigators in the world, with detective skills rivaling those of Ralph Dibny and Batman. Bobo has an Intelligence Quotient estimated to be higher than 98 percent of the adult (human) population, as evidenced by his Mensa membership and his ability to decode the Voynich manuscript which remained unsolved for over five hundred years. Detective Chimp's hyper-intelligence has shown to have its downsides however as he has claimed it is difficult for him to concentrate without the help of alcohol to focus his mind. For a brief time, Detective Chimp also had additional sense-expanding powers granted him by the helmet of Doctor Fate.

Because a chimpanzee's muscles are much denser than a human's, Detective Chimp is unable to swim. Recent scientific evidence suggests that chimpanzees can swim, and this represents a continuity error (or Detective Chimp simply never learned to swim).

Other versions

Tangent: Superman's Reign
In Tangent: Superman's Reign, the Earth-9 version of Detective Chimp is revealed to be the screen name of a human hacker named Guy Gardner.

DC One Million and Dark Nights: Metal
In DC One Million, the far future version of Detective Chimp is one of the heroes of the Gorilla Galaxy, and wears a costume similar to Batman's. In 2018's Dark Nights: Metal story arc, an identical character also appears with the same name and background, although now located on the DC Multiverse alternate Earth known as Earth 52.

In other media

Television
 Detective Chimp appears in the Batman: The Brave and the Bold, voiced by Kevin Michael Richardson. This version speaks in a pronounced English dialect.
 Detective Chimp appears in the Teen Titans Go! episodes "You're Fired!" and "DC", voiced by Scott Menville in the former and Fred Tatasciore in the latter.

Films
 Detective Chimp appears in Scooby-Doo! & Batman: The Brave and the Bold, voiced again by Kevin Michael Richardson.
 Detective Chimp appears in Teen Titans Go! To the Movies.

Video games
 Detective Chimp appears as a playable character in Lego Batman 3: Beyond Gotham, voiced by Dee Bradley Baker.
 Detective Chimp was originally set to appear as a playable character in Injustice 2, but was cut from the game for unknown reasons.
 Detective Chimp appears as a playable character in Lego DC Super-Villains.

Miscellaneous
 Detective Chimp appears in issue #39 of the Justice League Unlimited tie-in comic book series. This version is a native of Gorilla City.
 Detective Chimp appears in a self-titled issue of the DC Comics Super Hero Collection.
 Detective Chimp appears in the Injustice: Gods Among Us prequel comic. He is recruited by John Constantine to join Batman's Insurgency in combating Superman's Regime. During a meeting at Jason Blood's home, Chimp convinces the uncertain Harvey Bullock not to leave, bonding with him over being outside of their respective elements. However, Bullock unknowingly broke the protective seal, allowing Mister Mxyzptlk disguised as the Spectre to attack, vaporizing Bullock and Blood. Chimp gets caught in the blast and loses an eye, but is rescued by Alfred Pennyworth, who joins Zatanna and Harley Quinn in traveling to the Tower of Fate so they can resuscitate him. Harley and Klarion the Witch Boy eventually revive Chimp, who is forced to wear an eye patch. After Klarion is killed by Sinestro, Chimp reveals the former's magic kept him alive and fades from existence.

References

External links
 The Thrilling Detective Web Site- Detective Chimp
 Don Markstein's Toonopedia Detective Chimp
 52: This Chimp Can Chat Faux interview with Detective Chimp
 Silver Age Gold: Well, If You're Going to "Ape" Sherlock Holmes...

Animal superheroes
DC Comics animals
DC Comics superheroes
Fictional detectives
Fictional Republicans (United States)
Fictional chimpanzees
Comics characters introduced in 1952
Characters created by John Broome
Characters created by Carmine Infantino
DC Comics fantasy characters
Fictional Mensans
Legion of Super-Pets